Ketanji Onyika Brown Jackson (born Ketanji Onyika Brown;  ; born September 14, 1970) is an American jurist who serves as an associate justice of the Supreme Court of the United States. Jackson was nominated to the Supreme Court by President Joe Biden on February 25, 2022. She was confirmed by the United States Senate on April 7, 2022, and sworn into office on June 30. She was previously a United States circuit judge of the United States Court of Appeals for the District of Columbia Circuit from 2021 to 2022.

Born in Washington, D.C., and raised in Miami, Florida, Jackson attended Harvard University for college and law school, where she served as an editor of the Harvard Law Review. She began her legal career with three clerkships, including one with U.S. Supreme Court Associate Justice Stephen Breyer. Prior to her elevation to the Court of Appeals, she served as a district judge for the United States District Court for the District of Columbia from 2013 to 2021. Jackson was also vice chair of the United States Sentencing Commission from 2010 to 2014. Since 2016, she has been a member of the Harvard Board of Overseers.

Jackson succeeded Justice Breyer upon his retirement from the court on June 30, 2022. She is the first Black woman and the first former federal public defender to serve on the Supreme Court.

Early life and education 
Jackson was born Ketanji Onyika Brown on September 14, 1970, in Washington, D.C. Her parents were both graduates of historically black colleges and universities. Her father, Johnny Brown, further attended the University of Miami School of Law and ultimately became the chief attorney for the Miami-Dade County School Board; her mother, Ellery, served as school principal at New World School of the Arts in Miami, Florida. In 1989, when Jackson was a freshman at Harvard, her uncle, Thomas Brown Jr., was sentenced to life in prison for a nonviolent cocaine conviction in which federal agents found 14 kilograms of cocaine, wrapped in duct tape, court records show. Years later, Jackson persuaded a law firm to take his case pro bono, and President Barack Obama eventually commuted his sentence. Another uncle, Calvin Ross, served as Miami's chief of police.

Jackson grew up in the Miami, Florida, area and attended Miami Palmetto Senior High School. In her senior year, she won the national oratory title at the National Catholic Forensic League championships in New Orleans. She is quoted in her high school yearbook saying that she "[wanted] to go into law and eventually have a judicial appointment." She graduated from Miami Palmetto in 1988.

Jackson then studied government at Harvard University, having applied to Harvard despite her high school guidance counselor's advice to set her sights lower. At Harvard, Jackson performed improv comedy and took classes in drama, and led protests against a student who displayed a Confederate flag from his dorm window. Jackson graduated from Harvard in 1992 with an A.B., magna cum laude. Her senior thesis was titled "The Hand of Oppression: Plea Bargaining Processes and the Coercion of Criminal Defendants".

Jackson worked as a staff reporter and researcher for Time magazine from 1992 to 1993, then attended Harvard Law School, where she was a supervising editor of the Harvard Law Review. She graduated in 1996 with a Juris Doctor, cum laude.

Early career 

After law school, Jackson served as a law clerk to judge Patti B. Saris of the United States District Court for the District of Massachusetts from 1996 to 1997, then to judge Bruce M. Selya of the United States Court of Appeals for the First Circuit from 1997 to 1998. She spent a year in private practice at the Washington, D.C., law firm of Miller Cassidy Larroca & Lewin (now part of Baker Botts), then clerked for U.S. Supreme Court justice Stephen Breyer from 1999 to 2000.

Jackson worked in private legal practice from 2000 to 2003, first at the law firm of Goodwin Procter from 2000 to 2002, then with Kenneth Feinberg at the law firm now called Feinberg & Rozen LLP from 2002 to 2003. From 2003 to 2005, she was an assistant special counsel to the United States Sentencing Commission. From 2005 to 2007, Jackson was an assistant federal public defender in Washington, D.C., where she handled cases before the United States Court of Appeals for the District of Columbia Circuit. A Washington Post review of cases Jackson handled during her time as a public defender showed that "she won uncommon victories against the government that shortened or erased lengthy prison terms". From 2007 to 2010, Jackson was an appellate specialist in private practice at the law firm of Morrison & Foerster.

U.S. Sentencing Commission (2010–2014)
On July 23, 2009, Barack Obama nominated Jackson to become vice chair of the United States Sentencing Commission. The United States Senate confirmed Jackson by unanimous consent on February 11, 2010. She succeeded Michael E. Horowitz, who had served from 2003 until 2009. Jackson served on the Sentencing Commission until 2014. During her time on the commission, it retroactively amended the Sentencing Guidelines to reduce the guideline range for crack cocaine offenses, and enacted the "drugs minus two" amendment, which implemented a two offense-level reduction for drug crimes.

District Court judge (2013–2021) 

On September 20, 2012, Obama nominated Jackson to serve as a United States district judge for the United States District Court for the District of Columbia to the seat vacated by retiring judge Henry H. Kennedy Jr. Jackson was introduced at her December 2012 confirmation hearing by Republican Paul Ryan, a relative through marriage, who said "Our politics may differ, but my praise for Ketanji's intellect, for her character, for her integrity, it is unequivocal." On February 14, 2013, her nomination was reported to the full Senate by voice vote of the Senate Judiciary Committee. She was confirmed by the full Senate by voice vote on March 22, 2013. She received her commission on March 26, 2013, and was sworn in by Justice Breyer in May 2013. Her service as a district judge was terminated on June 17, 2021, when she was elevated to the United States Court of Appeals for the District of Columbia Circuit.

During her time on the District Court, Jackson wrote multiple decisions adverse to the positions of the Trump administration. In her opinion ordering Trump's former White House counsel Donald McGahn to comply with a legislative subpoena, she wrote "presidents are not kings". Jackson handled a number of challenges to executive agency actions that raised questions of administrative law. She also issued rulings in several cases that gained particular political attention.

Bloomberg Law reported in spring 2021 that conservative activists were pointing to certain decisions by Jackson that had been reversed on appeal as a "potential blemish on her record". In 2019, Jackson ruled that provisions in three Trump executive orders conflicted with federal employee rights to collective bargaining. Her decision was reversed unanimously by the D.C. Circuit. Another 2019 decision, involving a challenge to a Department of Homeland Security decision to expand the agency's definition of which noncitizens could be deported, was also reversed by the D.C. Circuit. Nan Aron, president of the liberal Alliance for Justice, defended Jackson's record, saying Jackson "has written nearly 600 opinions and been reversed less than twelve times".

Selected rulings 

In American Meat Institute v. U.S. Department of Agriculture (2013), Jackson rejected the meat packing industry's request for a preliminary injunction to block a United States Department of Agriculture rule requiring them to identify animals' country of origin. Jackson found that the rule likely did not violate the First Amendment.

In Depomed v. Department of Health and Human Services (2014), Jackson ruled that the Food and Drug Administration had violated the Administrative Procedure Act when it failed to grant pharmaceutical company Depomed market exclusivity for its orphan drug Gralise. Jackson concluded that the Orphan Drug Act required the FDA to grant Gralise exclusivity.

In Pierce v. District of Columbia (2015), Jackson ruled that the D.C. Department of Corrections violated the rights of a deaf inmate under the Americans with Disabilities Act because jail officials failed to provide the inmate with reasonable accommodations, or to assess his need for reasonable accommodations, during his detention in 2012. Jackson held that "the District's willful blindness regarding" Pierce's need for accommodation and its half-hearted attempt to provide Pierce with a random assortment of auxiliary aids—and only after he specifically requested them—fell far short of what the law requires."

In April and June 2018, Jackson presided over two cases challenging the Department of Health and Human Services' decision to terminate grants for teen pregnancy prevention programs two years early. Jackson ruled that the decision to terminate the grants early, without any explanation for doing so, was arbitrary and capricious.

In American Federation of Government Employees, AFL-CIO v. Trump (2018), Jackson invalidated provisions of three executive orders that would have limited the time federal employee labor union officials could spend with union members, the issues that unions could bargain over in negotiations, and the rights of disciplined workers to appeal disciplinary actions. Jackson concluded that the executive orders violated the right of federal employees to collectively bargain, as guaranteed by the Federal Service Labor-Management Relations Statute. The D.C. Circuit vacated this ruling on jurisdictional grounds in 2019.

In 2018, Jackson dismissed 40 wrongful death and product liability lawsuits stemming from the disappearance of Malaysia Airlines Flight 370, which had been combined into a single multidistrict litigation. Jackson held that under the doctrine of forum non conveniens, the suits should be brought in Malaysia, not the United States. The D.C. Circuit affirmed this ruling in 2020.

In 2019, in Center for Biological Diversity v. McAleenan, Jackson held that Congress had, through the Illegal Immigration Reform and Immigrant Responsibility Act, stripped federal courts of jurisdiction to hear non-constitutional challenges to the United States Secretary of Homeland Security's decision to waive certain environmental requirements to facilitate construction of a border wall on the United States and Mexico border.

In 2019, Jackson issued a preliminary injunction in Make The Road New York v. McAleenan, blocking a Trump administration rule that would have expanded expedited removal ("fast-track" deportations) without immigration court hearings for undocumented immigrants. Jackson found that the U.S. Department of Homeland Security had violated the Administrative Procedure Act (APA) because its decision was arbitrary and capricious and the agency did not seek public comment before issuing the rule. In a 2–1 ruling in 2020, the D.C. Circuit reversed the entry of the preliminary injunction, ruling that the IIRIRA (by committing the matter to the executive branch's "sole and unreviewable discretion") precluded APA review of the decision.

In 2019, Jackson issued a ruling in Committee on the Judiciary of the U.S. House of Representatives v. McGahn in which the House Committee on the Judiciary sued Don McGahn, former White House Counsel for the Trump administration, to compel him to comply with the subpoena to appear at a hearing on its impeachment inquiry on issues of alleged obstruction of justice by the administration. McGahn declined to comply with the subpoena after U.S. President Donald Trump, relying on a legal theory of executive testimonial immunity, ordered McGahn not to testify. In a lengthy opinion, Jackson ruled in favor of the House Committee and held that senior-level presidential aides "who have been subpoenaed for testimony by an authorized committee of Congress must appear for testimony in response to that subpoena" even if the President orders them not to do so. Jackson rejected the administration's assertion of executive testimonial immunity by holding that "with respect to senior-level presidential aides, absolute immunity from compelled congressional process simply does not exist." According to Jackson, that conclusion was "inescapable precisely because compulsory appearance by dint of a subpoena is a legal construct, not a political one, and per the Constitution, no one is above the law." Jackson's use of the phrase "presidents are not kings" gained popular attention in subsequent media reporting on the ruling. In noting that Jackson took four months to resolve the case, including writing a 120-page opinion, The Washington Post wrote: "That slow pace contributed to helping Mr. Trump run out the clock on the congressional oversight effort before the 2020 election." The ruling was appealed by the United States Department of Justice, and the D.C. Circuit affirmed part of Jackson's decision nine months later in August 2020. While the case remained pending, on June 4, 2021, McGahn testified behind closed doors under an agreement reached with the Biden administration.

Court of Appeals (2021–2022)
On March 30, 2021, President Joe Biden announced his intent to nominate Jackson to serve as a United States circuit judge for the United States Court of Appeals for the District of Columbia Circuit. On April 19, 2021, her nomination was sent to the Senate. President Biden nominated Jackson to the seat vacated by Judge Merrick Garland, who stepped down to become attorney general.

On April 28, 2021, a hearing on her nomination was held before the Senate Judiciary Committee. During her confirmation hearing, Jackson was questioned about several of her rulings against the Trump administration. On May 20, 2021, Jackson's nomination was reported out of committee by a 13–9 vote. On June 10, 2021, the United States Senate invoked cloture on her nomination by a 52–46 vote. On June 14, 2021, her nomination was confirmed by a 53–44 vote. Republican senators Susan Collins, Lindsey Graham, and Lisa Murkowski joined all 50 Democrats in voting to confirm her nomination. She received her judicial commission on June 17, 2021.
Her service as a circuit judge was terminated on June 29, 2022, the day before she was sworn in as the Associate Justice of the United States Supreme Court.

In her first written opinion for the court of appeals, Jackson, joined by the rest of the panel, invalidated a 2020 rule by the Federal Labor Relations Authority that had restricted the bargaining power of federal-sector labor unions.

Supreme Court (2022–present)

Nomination and confirmation 

In early 2016, the Obama administration officials vetted Jackson as a potential nominee to the Supreme Court of the United States to fill the vacancy left by the death of Justice Antonin Scalia. Jackson was one of five candidates interviewed as a potential nominee for the vacancy.

In early 2022, news outlets speculated that Biden would nominate Jackson to the U.S. Supreme Court to fill the seat vacated by Stephen Breyer. Biden pledged during the 2020 United States presidential election campaign to appoint a Black woman to the court, should a vacancy occur. Jackson's appointment to the D.C. Circuit, considered to be the second most influential federal court in the United States, behind only the Supreme Court, was viewed as preparation for a potential promotion to the Supreme Court.

Jackson's potential nomination to the Supreme Court was supported by civil rights and liberal advocacy organizations. Her potential nomination was opposed by Republican Party leaders and senators. The Washington Post wrote that Jackson's experience as a public defender "has endeared her to the more liberal base of the Democratic Party". While her supporters have touted her history as a public defender as an asset, during her 2021 confirmation hearing, Republicans tried to cast her public defender work as a liability.

On February 25, 2022, Biden announced that Jackson was his nominee for associate justice of the Supreme Court. Her nomination was sent to the Senate on February 28. Her confirmation hearings before the Senate Judiciary Committee opened on March 21. After the Judiciary Committee deadlocked in an 11–11 vote, her nomination was advanced on April 4 by a 53–47 procedural vote in the Senate. She was subsequently confirmed by the same margin on April 7, 2022. Republicans Mitt Romney, Lisa Murkowski, and Susan Collins joined the Democrats in confirming Jackson to the Supreme Court. She received her judicial commission as an associate justice on April 8, 2022. She was sworn in and became an associate justice on June 30, 2022, at noon, when Breyer's retirement went into effect.

Tenure
The Supreme Court released its final merit opinions during the morning of June 30, 2022. At noon, Justice Breyer officially retired and Jackson was sworn in, becoming the first Black woman and the first former federal public defender to serve on the Supreme Court.

On July 21, Jackson voted on her first Supreme Court case, joining the dissent in a 5–4 decision refusing to block a district court ruling that prevented the Biden administration from setting new enforcement priorities for immigrants entering the U.S. or living in the country illegally. She participated in her first oral argument as an associate justice on October 3, in Sackett v. Environmental Protection Agency. On November 7 she wrote her first opinion, a two-page dissent from a denial of review in the case of a death row inmate in Chinn v. Shoop; the opinion was joined by Justice Sotomayor. 

Two contributors for SCOTUSBlog noted that since joining the Court at the beginning of the 2022 term, Jackson was the most active participant in oral arguments, having spoken an average of 1,350 words per argument, while the eight other justices each have spoken on average fewer than 1,000 words per argument. On February 28, 2023, Jackson authored her first opinion for a unanimous court in Delaware v. Pennsylvania, which involved how unclaimed money from MoneyGrams are distributed among individual states.

Circuit assignment
On September 28, 2022, Jackson was assigned to the First Circuit.

Judicial philosophy 
Jackson says she does not have a particular judicial philosophy; instead, she says she has a perspective on legal analysis or a "judicial methodology." Though she has not embraced the label, Jackson has expressed that she sees value in originalism by stating the "Constitution is fixed in its meaning," and has explicitly criticized living constitutionalism.

In January 2022, The New York Times reported that Jackson had "not yet written a body of appeals court opinions expressing a legal philosophy" because she had joined the U.S. Court of Appeals for the D.C. Circuit in the summer of 2021. However, The Times said, Jackson's earlier rulings "comported with those of a liberal-leaning judge", including her opinions blocking various Trump administration actions. Additionally, a review of over 500 of her judicial opinions indicated that she would likely be as liberal as Justice Stephen Breyer, the justice she replaced.

According to Sahil Kapur, writing for NBC News, "Jackson fits well with the Democratic Party and the progressive movement's agenda" due to her relative youth, background as a public defender, and history of labor-friendly rulings.

Politico reported that "Jackson is popular with liberal legal activists looking to replace Breyer with a justice willing to engage in ideological combat with the court's conservatives."

Affiliations 

Jackson is a member of the Judicial Conference Committee on Defender Services as well as Harvard University's Board of Overseers and the Council of the American Law Institute. She also currently serves on the board of Georgetown Day School and the U.S. Supreme Court Fellows Commission.

From 2010 to 2011, she served on the advisory board of Montrose Christian School which was a Baptist school. Jackson has served as a judge in several mock trials with the Shakespeare Theatre Company and for the Historical Society of the District of Columbia's Mock Court Program. Jackson presided over a mock trial, hosted by Drexel University's Thomas R. Kline School of Law in 2018, "to determine if Vice President Aaron Burr was guilty of murdering" Alexander Hamilton.

In 2017, Jackson presented at the University of Georgia School of Law's 35th Edith House Lecture. In 2018, Jackson participated as a panelist at the National Constitution Center's town hall on the legacy of Alexander Hamilton. In 2020, Jackson gave the Martin Luther King Jr. Day lecture at the University of Michigan Law School and was honored at the University of Chicago Law School's third annual Judge James B. Parsons Legacy Dinner, which was hosted by the school's Black Law Students Association. In 2022, Jackson received the American Academy of Achievement’s Golden Plate Award presented by Awards Council members Justice Amy Coney Barrett and retired Justice Anthony Kennedy.

Personal life 
In 1996, Brown married surgeon Patrick Graves Jackson, whom she met at Harvard College.  He is a descendant of Continental Congress delegate Jonathan Jackson, and is related to U.S. Supreme Court Justice Oliver Wendell Holmes Jr. The couple have two daughters, Leila and Talia. Jackson is a non-denominational Protestant. In a 2017 speech, Jackson said "I am fairly certain that if you traced my family lineage back past my grandparents — who were raised in Georgia, by the way — you would find that my ancestors were slaves on both sides." Jackson's paternal ancestry can be traced back to Houston County, Georgia, while her maternal ancestry can be traced back to Calhoun County, Georgia. Through her marriage, Jackson is related to former Speaker of the House Paul Ryan.

Published works

See also 

 Barack Obama Supreme Court candidates
 Demographics of the Supreme Court of the United States
 Joe Biden judicial appointment controversies
 Joe Biden Supreme Court candidates
 List of African-American jurists
 List of African-American federal judges
 List of justices of the Supreme Court of the United States
 List of law clerks of the Supreme Court of the United States (Seat 2)
 List of United States Supreme Court justices by time in office

Notes

References

External links

 
 whitehouse.gov: Portrait 
 
 

|-

|-

|-

1970 births
Living people
20th-century American women lawyers
20th-century American lawyers
21st-century American women lawyers
21st-century African-American women
21st-century American lawyers
21st-century American judges
21st-century American women judges
African-American women lawyers
African-American lawyers
African-American judges
American Protestants
Harvard Law School alumni
Judges of the United States District Court for the District of Columbia
Judges of the United States Court of Appeals for the D.C. Circuit
Justices of the Supreme Court of the United States
Current Justices of the Supreme Court of the United States
Law clerks of the Supreme Court of the United States
Lawyers from Miami
Lawyers from Washington, D.C.
Members of the United States Sentencing Commission
Miami Palmetto Senior High School alumni
People associated with Morrison & Foerster
Public defenders
United States district court judges appointed by Barack Obama
United States court of appeals judges appointed by Joe Biden
United States federal judges appointed by Joe Biden